In statistics and information theory, a maximum entropy probability distribution has entropy that is at least as great as that of all other members of a specified class of probability distributions. According to the principle of maximum entropy, if nothing is known about a distribution except that it belongs to a certain class (usually defined in terms of specified properties or measures), then the distribution with the largest entropy should be chosen as the least-informative default. The motivation is twofold: first, maximizing entropy minimizes the amount of prior information built into the distribution; second, many physical systems tend to move towards maximal entropy configurations over time.

Definition of entropy and differential entropy 

If  is a discrete random variable with distribution given by

The quantity  is understood to be zero whenever .

This is a special case of more general forms described in the articles Entropy (information theory), Principle of maximum entropy, and differential entropy. In connection with maximum entropy distributions, this is the only one needed, because maximizing  will also maximize the more general forms.

The base of the logarithm is not important as long as the same one is used consistently: change of base merely results in a rescaling of the entropy. Information theorists may prefer to use base 2 in order to express the entropy in bits; mathematicians and physicists will often prefer the natural logarithm, resulting in a unit of nats for the entropy.

The choice of the measure  is however crucial in determining the entropy and the resulting maximum entropy distribution, even though the usual recourse to the Lebesgue measure is often defended as "natural".

Distributions with measured constants 
Many statistical distributions of applicable interest are those for which the moments or other measurable quantities are constrained to be constants. The following theorem by Ludwig Boltzmann gives the form of the probability density under these constraints.

Continuous case 
Suppose  is a closed subset of the real numbers  and we choose to specify  measurable functions  and  numbers . We consider the class  of all real-valued random variables which are supported on  
(i.e. whose density function is zero outside of ) and which satisfy 
the  moment conditions: 
  

where we assume that .

Note that if the moment conditions are equalities (instead of inequalities), that is, 
  
then the constraint condition  is dropped, making the optimization over the Lagrange multipliers unconstrained.

Discrete case 
Suppose  is a (finite or infinite) discrete subset of the reals and we choose to specify  functions f1,...,fn and n numbers a1,...,an. We consider the class C of all discrete random variables X which are supported on S and which satisfy the n moment conditions 
 

If there exists a member of C which assigns positive probability to all members of S and if there exists a  maximum entropy distribution for C, then this distribution has the following shape:

where we assume that  and the constants     solve the constrained optimization problem with :

Again,  if the moment conditions are equalities (instead of inequalities), then the constraint condition  is not present in the optimization.

Proof in the case of equality constraints
In the case of equality constraints, this theorem is proved with the calculus of variations and Lagrange multipliers. The constraints can be written as

We consider the functional

The zeroth constraint ensures the second axiom of probability. The other constraints are that the measurements of the function are given constants up to order . The entropy attains an extremum when the functional derivative is equal to zero:

It is an exercise for the reader that this extremum is indeed a maximum. Therefore, the maximum entropy probability distribution in this case must be of the form

The proof of the discrete version is essentially the same.

Uniqueness of the maximum  
Suppose ,  are distributions satisfying the expectation-constraints. Letting  and considering the distribution  it is clear that this distribution satisfies the expectation-constraints and furthermore has as support . From basic facts about entropy, it holds that . Taking limits  and  respectively yields .

It follows that a distribution satisfying the expectation-constraints and maximising entropy must necessarily have full support — i. e. the distribution is almost everywhere positive. It follows that the maximising distribution must be an internal point in the space of distributions satisfying the expectation-constraints, that is, it must be a local extreme. Thus it suffices to show that the local extreme is unique, in order to show both that the entropy-maximising distribution is unique (and this also shows that the local extreme is the global maximum).

Suppose  are local extremes. Letting  one obtains:

Computing further one has

Assuming that no non-trivial linear combination of the observables is almost everywhere (a.e.) constant, (which e.g. holds if the observables are independent and not a.e. constant), it holds that  has non-zero variance, unless . By the above equation it is thus clear, that the latter must be the case. Hence , so the parameters characterising the local extrema  are identical, which means that the distributions themselves are identical. Thus, the local extreme is unique and by the above discussion, the maximum is unique—provided a local extreme actually exists.

Caveats 
Note that not all classes of distributions contain a maximum entropy distribution. It is possible that a class contain distributions of arbitrarily large entropy (e.g. the class of all continuous distributions on R with mean 0 but arbitrary standard deviation), or that the entropies are bounded above but there is no distribution which attains the maximal entropy. It is also possible that the expected value restrictions for the class C force the probability distribution to be zero in certain subsets of S. In that case our theorem doesn't apply, but one can work around this by shrinking the set S.

Examples 

Every probability distribution is trivially a maximum entropy probability distribution under the constraint that the distribution has its own entropy. By choosing  to be the measurable function and

to be the constant,  is the maximum entropy probability distribution under the constraint

.

Nontrivial examples are distributions that are subject to multiple constraints that are different from the assignment of the entropy.  These are often found by starting with the same procedure  and finding that  can be separated into parts.

A table of examples of maximum entropy distributions is given in Lisman (1972) and Park & Bera (2009).

Uniform and piecewise uniform distributions 

The uniform distribution on the interval [a,b] is the maximum entropy distribution among all continuous distributions which are supported in the interval [a, b], and thus the probability density is 0 outside of the interval. This uniform density can be related to Laplace's principle of indifference, sometimes called the principle of insufficient reason. More generally, if we are given a subdivision a=a0 < a1 < ... < ak = b of the interval [a,b] and probabilities p1,...,pk that add up to one, then we can consider the class of all continuous distributions such that

The density of the maximum entropy distribution for this class is constant on each of the intervals [aj-1,aj). The uniform distribution on the finite set {x1,...,xn} (which assigns a probability of 1/n to each of these values) is the maximum entropy distribution among all discrete distributions supported on this set.

Positive and specified mean: the exponential distribution 

The exponential distribution, for which the density function is

is the maximum entropy distribution among all continuous distributions supported in [0,∞) that have a specified mean of 1/λ.

In the case of distributions supported on [0,∞), the maximum entropy distribution depends on relationships between the first and second moments. In specific cases, it may be the exponential distribution, or may be another distribution, or may be undefinable.

Specified mean and variance: the normal distribution 

The normal distribution N(μ,σ2), for which the density function is

has maximum entropy among all real-valued distributions supported on (−∞,∞) with a specified variance σ2 (a particular moment). The same is true when the mean μ and the variance σ2 is specified (the first two moments), since entropy is translation invariant on (−∞,∞). Therefore, the assumption of normality imposes the minimal prior structural constraint beyond these moments. (See the differential entropy article for a derivation.)

Discrete distributions with specified mean 

Among all the discrete distributions supported on the set {x1,...,xn} with a specified mean μ, the maximum entropy distribution has the following shape:

where the positive constants C and r can be determined by the requirements that the sum of all the probabilities must be 1 and the expected value must be μ.

For example, if a large number N of dice are thrown, and you are told that the sum of all the shown numbers is S. Based on this information alone, what would be a reasonable assumption for the number of dice showing 1, 2, ..., 6? This is an instance of the situation considered above, with {x1,...,x6} = {1,...,6} and μ = S/N.

Finally, among all the discrete distributions supported on the infinite set  with mean μ, the maximum entropy distribution has the shape:

where again the constants C and r were determined by the requirements that the sum of all the probabilities must be 1 and the expected value must be μ. For example, in the case that xk = k, this gives

such that respective maximum entropy distribution is the geometric distribution.

Circular random variables 

For a continuous random variable  distributed about the unit circle, the Von Mises distribution maximizes the entropy when the real and imaginary parts of the first circular moment are specified or, equivalently, the circular mean and circular variance are specified.

When the mean and variance of the angles  modulo  are specified, the wrapped normal distribution maximizes the entropy.

Maximizer for specified mean, variance and skew 

However, there is no distribution which achieves this upper bound, because  is unbounded when  (see Cover & Thomas (2006: chapter 12)).

However, the maximum entropy is -achievable: a distribution's entropy can be arbitrarily close to the upper bound.  Start with a normal distribution of the specified mean and variance.  To introduce a positive skew, perturb the normal distribution upward by a small amount at a value many  larger than the mean.  The skewness, being proportional to the third moment, will be affected more than the lower order moments.

Maximizer for specified mean and deviation risk measure

Every distribution with  log-concave density is a maximal entropy distribution with specified mean μ and Deviation risk measure D.

In particular, the maximal entropy distribution with specified mean  and deviation   is:

The normal distribution  , if  is the standard deviation;
The Laplace distribution, if  is the average absolute deviation;
 The distribution with density of the form  if  is the standard lower semi-deviation, where , and a,b,c are constants.

Other examples
In the table below, each listed distribution maximizes the entropy for a particular set of functional constraints listed in the third column, and the constraint that x be included in the support of the probability density, which is listed in the fourth column. Several examples (Bernoulli, geometric, exponential, Laplace, Pareto) listed are trivially true because their associated constraints are equivalent to the assignment of their entropy. They are included anyway because their constraint is related to a common or easily measured quantity.

The maximum entropy principle can be used to upper bound the entropy of statistical mixtures.

See also
 Exponential family
 Gibbs measure
 Partition function (mathematics)
 Maximal Entropy Random Walk - maximizing entropy rate for a graph

Notes

Citations

References 
 
 F. Nielsen, R. Nock (2017), MaxEnt upper bounds for the differential entropy of univariate continuous distributions, IEEE Signal Processing Letters, 24(4), 402-406 
 I. J. Taneja (2001), Generalized Information Measures and Their Applications. Chapter 1
 Nader Ebrahimi, Ehsan S. Soofi, Refik Soyer (2008), "Multivariate maximum entropy identification, transformation, and dependence", Journal of Multivariate Analysis 99: 1217–1231, 

Entropy and information
Continuous distributions
Discrete distributions
Particle statistics
Types of probability distributions